The National Humanities Medal is an American award that annually recognizes several individuals, groups, or institutions for work that has "deepened the nation's understanding of the humanities, broadened our citizens' engagement with the humanities, or helped preserve and expand Americans' access to important resources in the humanities."

The annual Charles Frankel Prize in the Humanities was established in 1988 and succeeded by the National Humanities Medal in 1997. The token is a bronze medal designed by a 1995 Frankel Prize winner, David Macaulay.

Medals are conferred annually, usually by the U.S. President, to as many as twelve living candidates and existing organizations nominated early in the calendar year. The president selects the winners in consultation with the National Endowment for the Humanities (NEH). NEH asks that nominators consult the list of previous winners and consider the National Medal of Arts to recognize contributions in "the creative or performing arts".

Recipients 
Medalists are listed by year, then alphabetically by surname.

2022
Elton John

2021
None awarded
2020

2019

2018
None awarded

2017
None awarded

2016
None awarded

2015

2014

2013

2012

2011

2010

2009

2008

2007

2006

2005

2004

2003

2002

2001

2000

1999

1998

1997

Charles Frankel Prize 
1996

1995

1994

1993

1992

1991

1990

1989

References 

Awards established in 1988
Humanities awards